Thirst Buster is a frosty, non-alcoholic, slushy beverage available at Shell Canada gas stations. It is available in various flavors.

Thirst Busters are made using a mixture of syrup, frozen water, and carbon dioxide. The ingredients are fed into the Slush Buster Machine at different pressures, blended, then pushed under pressure into a stainless steel chilling tank. The tank contains rotating scraper arms to prevent the mixture from freezing. When the customer opens the tap, the machine's internal pressure pushes the mixture out.

See also
 Slurpee
 Icee
 List of frozen dessert brands

Non-alcoholic drinks
Brand name frozen desserts